Babysitters on Acid is the first album by the American punk rock band the Lunachicks. It was released in 1990 by Blast First Records. It was re-released in 2001 by Go-Kart Records.

Critical reception
AllMusic wrote that the album "didn't have much to say, but said it with enough base humor and zealous punk antics to keep the spirit of comic anti-revolution alive." Exclaim!, reviewing the reissue, called it "a dopey and young record that basically defies serious criticism." Louder Sound deemed the album "a day-glo classic of ramshackle excess and high-concept absurdity."

Track listing
All songs by Theo Kogan, except where noted.
"Jan Brady" - 3:09
"Glad I'm Not Yew" - 2:28
"Babysitters on Acid" - 4:07
"Makin' It (With Other Species)"- 1:38
"Mabel Rock" - 3:03
"Theme Song" - 6:40
"Born 2B Mild" - 2:22
"Pin Eye Woman 665" - 3:44
"Cookie Core" (Kogan, Silver) - 2:18
"Octopussy" - 3:35
"Sugar Luv" (Volpe) - 3:47
"Complication" - 2:18

References

Lunachicks albums
Blast First albums
1990 debut albums